This is a list of football games played by the Netherlands national football team between 2010 and 2019.

Matches

2010

2011

2012

2013

2014

2015

2016

2017

2018

2019

References

2009–10 in Dutch football
2010–11 in Dutch football
2010s in the Netherlands
2011–12 in Dutch football
2012–13 in Dutch football
2013–14 in Dutch football
2014–15 in Dutch football
2015–16 in Dutch football
2016–17 in Dutch football
2017–18 in Dutch football
2018–19 in Dutch football
2019–20 in Dutch football
2010